Guyruita is a genus of South American tarantulas that was first described by J. P. L. Guadanucci in 2007.

Species
 it contains six species, found in Venezuela and Brazil:
Guyruita atlantica Guadanucci, Lucas, Indicatti & Yamamoto, 2007 – Brazil
Guyruita cerrado Guadanucci, Lucas, Indicatti & Yamamoto, 2007 (type) – Brazil
Guyruita giupponii Fukushima & Bertani, 2018 – Brazil
Guyruita isae Fukushima & Bertani, 2018 – Brazil
Guyruita metallophila Fonseca-Ferreira, Zampaulo & Guadanucci, 2017 – Brazil
Guyruita waikoshiemi (Bertani & Araújo, 2006) – Venezuela, Brazil

See also
 List of Theraphosidae species

References

Theraphosidae genera
Spiders of South America
Theraphosidae